Marcelo René Velazco Ghiena (born February 14, 1970 in Montevideo, Uruguay) is a former Uruguayan naturalized Ecuadorian football player who played for clubs of Uruguay, Chile and Ecuador.

Teams
  Deportes Iquique 1996-1997
  Montevideo Wanderers 1997
  Frontera Rivera 1998-1999
  Danubio 2000
  Aucas 2001-2002
  Deportivo Cuenca 2003-2005
  Deportivo Quito 2006-2007
  Macará 2008
  Técnico Universitario 2009

Titles
  Deportivo Cuenca 2004 (Ecuadorian Primera División Championship)

References
 
 Profile at Tenfield Digital  

1970 births
Living people
Uruguayan footballers
Uruguayan expatriate footballers
Ecuadorian footballers
Ecuadorian expatriate footballers
Montevideo Wanderers F.C. players
Danubio F.C. players
Deportes Iquique footballers
C.D. Técnico Universitario footballers
C.D. Cuenca footballers
S.D. Quito footballers
S.D. Aucas footballers
C.S.D. Macará footballers
Primera B de Chile players
Expatriate footballers in Chile
Expatriate footballers in Ecuador
Expatriate footballers in Uruguay
Footballers from Montevideo
Uruguayan emigrants to Ecuador
Naturalized citizens of Ecuador
Association football defenders